Endri Karina (born 2 March 1989 in Elbasan, Albania) is an Albanian weightlifter. He competed for Albania at the 2012 Summer Olympics in the men's 94 kg category.  He finished in 14th place with a total of 350 kg, 195 kg in the clean and jerk and 155 kg in the snatch.

References

Albanian male weightlifters
Weightlifters at the 2012 Summer Olympics
Olympic weightlifters of Albania
1989 births
Living people
Sportspeople from Elbasan
20th-century Albanian people
21st-century Albanian people